The Puntland Police Force (PPF;) is the State police force and the main civil Law Enforcement Organization of Puntland. As with most other police forces in the world, its duties include crime fighting, traffic control, maintaining public safety, counter-terrorism. It is under the jurisdiction of the Minister of Security and DDR.

It served from 1998 to now as one of the principal organs of the Puntland Armed Forces and upon reorganisation distanced itself away from the Armed Forces. While organised at a national level, each arm reports to a county police authority, which in turn divides its force by local Police Divisions, headquartered at local police stations; the police force was later reconstituted at the start of the 21st century.

In an emergency, the police can be reached by dialing 999 from any telephone in Puntland.

Structure 

Puntland Police Force, located in Central of Garowe, is the central administration for the Puntland Police Force. 

It conducts management and supervision of the specialist agencies and police districts, including organizational development and support activities.

Commissioner is led by the Puntland Police Force, who, since 2022, has been Gen. Mumin Abdi Shire.

Units 
Puntland Police Force has 11 basic units and they are:
 Criminal Investigation Department
 Personnel Office
 Counter Terrorism 
 Road Safety
 Human Resource Development
 Administration & Management
 Transportation & Communication
 Operations
 Special Police Unit (SPU)
 BIRMAD Police Unit
 Godir Unit

CID 

Criminal Investigation Department is a state unit which works with organized and serious crime which handled investigations, fingerprinting, criminal records, immigration matters, and passports.

CID works as full member unit for Puntland Police Force, with special focus on technical and tactical investigation, in addition to being responsible on its own for organized crime. 

Establishments

Armo Police Academy

Department Overview

Puntland State Police, 

Puntland State Police is a full-service law enforcement agency.

See also 
 Puntland Maritime Police Force

References

External links 
 Puntland Police Commander Visits Police  Stations

Puntland
Somalia
Law enforcement agencies in Africa
1998 establishments in Somalia